A by-election for the Okinawa 3rd district in the Japanese House of Representatives was held on 21 April 2019. The seat became vacant following the candidacy and election of its representative, Denny Tamaki to the governorship of Okinawa Prefecture. Tamaki was one of the two representatives from the Liberal Party in the House. He had served the district almost continuously since 2009 and defended the seat by a 17.56% margin in the 2017 election. The by-election was held on the same day with the second round of the unified local elections and another House by-election in the Osaka 12th district. The Okinawa-wide referendum in February influenced the by-election campaign.

The candidate supported by Tamaki and the All-Okinawa coalition, Tomohiro Yara won the by-election against LDP candidate and former minister Aiko Shimajiri.

Candidates 
Aiko Shimajiri (LDP), former member of the House of Councillors and cabinet minister.
Tomohiro Yara (LP), freelance journalist (endorsed by the All-Okinawa coalition).

Campaign

Results

Footnotes

References 

Okinawa 3rd by-election
2019
Okinawa by-election
Election and referendum articles with incomplete results

ja:2019年日本の補欠選挙#補欠選挙実施選挙区と実施事由